The 1982 Western Kentucky Hilltoppers football team was an American football team that represented Western Kentucky University as an independent during the 1982 NCAA Division I-AA football season. Led by 15th-year head coach Jimmy Feix, the Hilltoppers compiled a record of 5–5. The team's captain was Tom Fox.

Schedule

References

Western Kentucky Hilltoppers football seasons
{Western Kentucky Hilltoppers football